Werner Botha (born 31 January 1978) is a South African sprinter. He competed in the men's 4 × 400 metres relay at the 2000 Summer Olympics.

References

External links
 

1978 births
Living people
Athletes (track and field) at the 2000 Summer Olympics
South African male sprinters
South African male middle-distance runners
Olympic athletes of South Africa
Place of birth missing (living people)